Schedule Network Analysis is a strategy that is commonly used in project management.  The strategy consists of visualising the different project tasks and making connections between them in the project management plan.

For making a final schedule, a schedule network analysis is finished utilizing a draft schedule. Numerous strategies may be utilized to make the final schedule, for example: 
 Defining critical and non-critical tasks using critical path method
 Ascertaining and analyze possible events that can take place in the future using scenario analysis
 Shortening the schedule using a schedule compression
 Considering activity interdependence and resource constraints using critical chain project management
 Overlooking resource allocation using resource leveling

See also 
 Computer network diagram
 Project network
 Precedence diagram method

References